Wirral may refer to:

 Wirral Peninsula, a peninsula in the northwest of England, between  the rivers Dee and Mersey
 Metropolitan Borough of Wirral in Merseyside, occupying the northern part of the Wirral Peninsula
 Wirral (UK Parliament constituency), a one-seat county constituency between 1885 and 1983
 Hundred of Wirral, the ancient administrative area for The Wirral
 Wirral Rural District, a former local government area of The Wirral between 1894 and 1933
 Wirral Urban District, a former local government area of The Wirral between 1933 and 1974
 Wirral Metropolitan College, a college of Further Education on the Wirral Peninsula
 Wirral-Enniskillen, a community in the Canadian province of New Brunswick named after the Peninsula

See also
 Wirral line, a commuter railway line in Wirral Peninsula